Alex Gauthier (born December 8, 1976) is a Canadian football offensive lineman who is currently retired. He most recently played for the Saskatchewan Roughriders of the Canadian Football League. He was drafted first overall by the expansion Ottawa Renegades in the 2002 CFL Draft. He was a CFL East All-Star in 2007. Gauthier was signed by the Roughriders in 2011. He played CIS football for the Laval Rouge et Or.

References

External links

1976 births
Living people
Calgary Stampeders players
Canadian football offensive linemen
Hamilton Tiger-Cats players
Laval Rouge et Or football players
Ottawa Renegades players
People from Maria, Quebec
Players of Canadian football from Quebec
Saskatchewan Roughriders players
Winnipeg Blue Bombers players